The full route planned will pass along the coast of South Wales, largely east–west from Newport to Cardiff and on to Margam via Bridgend, and in total may go on to stretch for  in length. The route is so far formed by a mixture of some new paths, such as a boardwalk made of recycled material around Caerleon, stone paths through Newport city centre, and in other places public highways. On some linked paths such as canal paths, a hybrid or 'hard tail' mountain bike fitted with wide road tyres would be most suitable.

Newport city centre and Cardiff are both easily reached on the rail network. Typically South Wales is more accessible through the canal paths heading up north into the valleys than east to west.

Route

Caerleon to Newport

This completed seven mile riverside path is a mixture of existing stone path and new hybrid materials running from the town centre of historic Caerleon and its former Roman Settlement site through to Newport city centre along the riverfront of the Usk. It is also within reach of the Celtic Manor Resort.

Newport to Cardiff

The first completed section is formed of the now completed Marshfield to the Duffryn path, completed in 2015.

The second section is the planned Marshfield to the Newport Road retail area and Cardiff City centre route being developed by Cardiff Council on the Cardiff Enfys network. A second Cycle Superhighway running on Newport Road and Cypress Drive is also being developed.

Cardiff to Penarth

The completed Cardiff section is largely based on the Cardiff Bay Trail with a bridge across the River Ely between Penarth and the Cardiff International Sports Village at Cardiff Bay. This connects the Sports Village to Cogan railway station, enabling commuting and linking to Penarth town centre.

References

External links
Sustrans map and description
 Wales Trails

National Cycle Routes
Cycleways in Wales
Transport in Anglesey
Transport in Gwynedd
Cycleways in Powys
Transport in Merthyr Tydfil
Transport in Rhondda Cynon Taf
Transport in Cardiff
Transport in Monmouthshire
Elenydd
Brecon Beacons